The Cairo Light Rail Transit (Arabic: القطار الكهربائي الخفيف) or Cairo LRT is an electrified regional rail system linking the city of Cairo to Egypt's New Administrative Capital and the 10th of Ramadan City. An initial 70 km route consisting of 12 stations was inaugurated on 3 July 2022.

Albeit being dubbed a light rail, the system is not a light rail in the sense the term is commonly used among transporation professionnels. In its technical characteristics it is more comparable to a modern regional commuter rail system such as the French RER or German German S-Bahns.

Further phases of the project are currently being built by a partnership between Egypt's National Authority for Tunnels and a consortium of Chinese construction companies. The full system is projected to extend over 100 km with 19 stations.

The Cairo LRT system is operated and maintained by RATP Dev under contract with the National Authority for Tunnels, i.e. the Egyptian Ministry for Transporation.

History 
The Light Rail Transit project was devised by the Egyptian government to link the New Administrative Capital to the current capital of Cairo. Additionally, the system would provide transportation to other New Urban Communities
to the east of Cairo, such as 10th of Ramadan City, Badr City, Obour or El Shorouk. In August 2017, a $1.24-billion contract was signed between Egypt's National Authority for Tunnels and a consortium of China Railway Engineering Corporation and AVIC International to start construction of the project.

On 3 July 2022, an inauguration ceremony took place with the attendance of Egyptian President Abdel Fattah el-Sisi and Chinese ambassador Liao Liqiang.

Route 
The system links Cairo with 10th of Ramadan City and with the New Administrative Capital. The main branch of the system serves the city of Cairo in Adly Mansour station, providing an interchange with Line 3 of the Cairo Metro. The line extends east serving the New Urban Communities of El Obour, Future City, El Shorouk, New Heliopolis and Badr City. At Badr Station the tracks separate, with one branch turning north towards 10th of Ramadan City and another turning south towards the New Administrative Capital. The northern branch currently terminates in the Knowledge City Station, in the outskirts of 10th of Ramadan. The line will eventually reach the center of the city.

The New Administrative Capital branch turns south, serving the Capital International Airport before terminating at Arts and Culture City. This station will provide an interchange with the Cairo-New Administrative Capital Monorail line in the future. The branch will eventually serve the Octagon military complex and the Nativity Cathedral before terminating at the future New Administrative Capital high-speed rail station.

Stations

See also 
 Cairo Monorail
 Cairo Metro
 High-speed rail in Egypt

References 

Rail transport in Egypt
Light rail in Africa
Transport in Cairo
RATP Group